Lady Heungbokwon of the Hongju Hong clan was the daughter of Hong-Gyu, Hongju Hong clan (홍주 홍씨, 洪州 洪氏)'s founder. who became the 12th wife of Taejo of Goryeo.

Her father, Hong-Gyu's first name was Geung-Jun (긍준), a nobles from Seongju. In March 927, Wang Geon attacked and occupied Unju Castle (운주성), which after this, Hong-Gyu gave his daughter to Wang and become his 12th wife. In addition, Unju was an important place since Chinese envoys always enter and depart to Goryeo from here. She later bore Taejo 1 son and a daughter, Princess Wang (공주 왕씨) who later married Wang Tae, Taejo and Queen Sinmyeong's oldest son. However, considering Wang Tae's younger brother, Wang Yo and Wang So succeeded the throne in the future, it seems that Wang Tae died at the young age.

References

External links
흥복원부인 on Encykorea .

Year of birth unknown
Year of death unknown
Consorts of Taejo of Goryeo
People from Hongseong County